Romina Laurito (born 4 May 1987, Gallarate) is an Italian rhythmic gymnast.

Career 

Luarito was an individual gymnast until 2007.

She was part of the 2010 and 2011 Italian Group that competed at the World Championships that won the Group All-around gold medal. Her teammates also won a pair of bronze medals at the 2012 World Cup Final in 5 Balls and 3 Ribbons + 2 Hoops. She has won a bronze medal at the 2012 Summer Olympics in the group all-around event together with other Group Members (Elisa Blanchi, Marta Pagnini, Elisa Santoni, Anzhelika Savrayuk, Andreea Stefanescu).

Detailed Olympic results

References 

Living people

Italian rhythmic gymnasts
Olympic gymnasts of Italy
Olympic bronze medalists for Italy
Olympic medalists in gymnastics
Gymnasts at the 2012 Summer Olympics
1987 births
Medalists at the 2012 Summer Olympics
Medalists at the Rhythmic Gymnastics World Championships
Medalists at the Rhythmic Gymnastics European Championships
People from Gallarate
Gymnasts of Centro Sportivo Aeronautica Militare
Sportspeople from the Province of Varese
21st-century Italian women